Children of the Black Sun is a studio album by Non, the primary project of musician Boyd Rice, released by Mute Records in 2002. Consists of seven tracks all of which are minimalist ambient noise compositions. One track, for instance, includes a French horn and a number of other instruments crescendoing while playing only one note, the result being a hypnotic and surprisingly varied composition. The album includes both a standard CD version and a DVD version recorded in Dolby 5.1 channel sound.

Track listing
 "Arka"
 "Black Sun"
 "Serpent of the Heavens"
 "Serpent of the Abyss"
 "The Underground Stream"
 "The Fountain of Fortune"
 "Son of the Sun"

References

External links
 Boyd Rice Discography at BoydRice.com

Boyd Rice albums
2002 albums
Mute Records albums